Vyzhnytsia is a town located in the historical region of Bukovina, on the Cheremosh River in Chernivtsi Oblast of western Ukraine. It is the administrative center of Vyzhnytsia Raion. Vyzhnytsia hosts the administration of Vyzhnytsia urban hromada, one of the hromadas of Ukraine. Population:

History 
While the city was probably mentioned as early as 1158, the first unequivocal mention comes in 1501 in a Moldavian chronicle. From 1514 to 1574 the place was occupied by the Turks, after which it belonged to the Principality of Moldova until 1774. From 1774 to 1918 he was part of the Austrian Empire (from 1849 part of the crown land of Bukovina).

Jewish history of the town 
In Judaism, the town is known as having been the original center of the Hassidic sect bearing its Yiddish name ( Vizhnitz). The town's Jewish community was decimated in the Holocaust and most survivors did not return, but the flourishing Vizhnitz Hassidic community in Israel and the United States continues to keep the name.

Until World War I, the town was named Wischnitz and was part of Austria-Hungary.

Part of Soviet Ukraine 
Vyzhnytsa has been a city since 1940. A local newspaper has been published in the city since February 1945.

In the late 1960s and early 1970s, Vyzhnytsa was the center of a flourishing Ukrainian-language music scene that was renowned all over the Soviet Union. The local house of culture was renowned for its parties with illegal Western pop music and attracted young people from as far as Chernivtsi. Volodymyr Ivasyuk was named as a regular visitor of these parties. There, he befriended musician Levko Dutkivskiy. Dutkivskiy from there on founded VIA Smerichka, with later Nazariy Yaremchuk and Vasyl Zinkevych as lead singers. Smerichka became one of Ukraine's most famous groups at the time, performing at Pesnya goda twice and winning Allo, my ishchem talanty! (Hello, we are looking for talents!) in 1972, one of the first Soviet television talent shows.

Part of modern Ukraine 
In January 1989 the population was 5708 people.

In 2011 a security checkpoint "Vyzhnytsia" was built here.

In January 2013 the population was 4207 people.

Transport 
 a railway station of the Lviv Railways.

Notable people
 Josef Burg, writer
 Gerard Ciołek, architect
 Menachem Mendel Hager, first Vizhnitser Rebbe
 Nazariy Yaremchuk, singer
 Otto Preminger, director
 Dol Dauber, musician
 Meir Just, Dutch rabbi

Gallery

Nearby towns
 Kuty
 Kosiv

References

Bukovina
Cities in Chernivtsi Oblast
Shtetls
Vizhnitz (Hasidic dynasty)
Cities of district significance in Ukraine
Duchy of Bukovina
Holocaust locations in Ukraine